Alfredo Gregorio "Al" Asuncion (October 2, 1929 – May 2, 2006) was a Filipino boxer. He represented his country during the 1952 Olympic Games in Helsinki. He participated in the Olympics as a flyweight. In the first round he won by knockout over Burmese boxer Basil Thompson, but lost in the second round to Willie Toweel of the South Africa.

He died in May 2, 2006 in his residence in Quezon City.

1952 Olympic results
Below is the record of Al Asuncion, a flyweight boxer from the Philippines who competed at the 1952 Helsinki Olympics:
 Round of 32: defeated Basil Thompson (Burma) by a second-round TKO
 Round of 16: lot to Willie Toweel (South Africa) by decision, 1–2

Personal life
Asuncion was married to Evangeline Custodio with whom he had a son and three daughters.

References

External links
 
 
 

1929 births
2006 deaths
Sportspeople from Quezon City
Filipino male boxers
Boxers at the 1952 Summer Olympics
Flyweight boxers
Olympic boxers of the Philippines